

Events

Publications
 Costanzo Antegnati – First book of masses for four voices (Brescia: Vincenzo Sabbio)
 Ippolito Baccusi
First book of motets, for five, six, and eight voices (Venice: Francesco Rampazatto)
Third book of madrigals for six voices (Venice: Angelo Gardano)
 Joachim a Burck (March 21) –  (Mühlhausen: George Hantzsch)
 Johannes de Cleve –  for four, five, six, seven, eight, and ten voices (Augsburg: Philipp Ulhard & Andreas Reinheckel)
 Nicolao Dorati – First book of madrigals for six voices (Venice: Angelo Gardano)
 Giovanni Dragoni – Third book of madrigals for five voices (Venice: heirs of Girolamo Scotto)
 Placido Falconio –  for four voices (Brescia: Vincenzo Sabbio)
 Stefano Felis – First book of madrigals for six voices (Venice: Angelo Gardano)
 Eucharius Hoffmann –  for four voices (Rostock: Augustin Ferber)
 Fernando de las Infantas
, book three, for six voices (Venice: heirs of Girolamo Scotto)
 (Venice: Girolamo Scotto), a book of counterpoint exercises
 Marc'Antonio Ingegneri – Second book of madrigals for four voices (Venice: Angelo Gardano)
 Ondřej Chrysoponus Jevíčský –  (Prague: Georg Nigrinus)
 Orlando di Lasso – 
 Giovanni de Macque – Madrigals for four, five, and six voices (Venice: Angelo Gardano)
 Claudio Merulo – First book of madrigals for four voices (Venice: Angelo Gardano)
 Philippe de Monte
 for six voices (Antwerp: Christophe Plantin)
Fifth book of motets for five voices (Venice: heirs of Girolamo Scotto)
 Benedetto Pallavicino – First book of madrigals for four voices (Venice: Angelo Gardano)

Births
date unknown – John Amner, composer and choirmaster at Ely Cathedral (died 1641)
probable – Melchior Franck, composer (died 1639)

Deaths
date unknown – Miguel de Fuenllana, composer (born c.1500)
probable – David Peebles, composer

 
Music
16th century in music
Music by year